2021 Academy Awards may refer to:

 93rd Academy Awards, the Academy Awards ceremony that took place April 25, 2021, honoring the best in film for January 2020 through February 2021
 94th Academy Awards, the Academy Awards ceremony that took place March 27, 2022